Aramburu or Aramburú is a Basque language surname. Notable people with the surname include:

Sport
Alejandro Aramburu (born 1969), Peruvian tennis player
Federico Martín Aramburú (1980–2022), Argentine rugby union player
Francisco Aramburu (1922–1997), Brazilian footballer, played for Brazil, and Vasco da Gama plus some other clubs
Izaskun Aramburu Balda (born 1975), Spanish sprint canoeist
Mateo Aramburu (born 1998), Uruguayan footballer, plays for Schalke 04 reserves
Patricio Arabolaza Aramburu (1893–1935), Spanish footballer, played for Spain in the 1920 Olympics

Other people
Fernando Aramburu (born 1959), Spanish writer
José de Arteche Aramburu (1906–1971), Basque author
Juan Carlos Aramburu (1912–2004), the Roman Catholic Archbishop of Buenos Aires, Argentina, from 1975 to 1990
Manuel Fernando de Aramburú y Frías (1777–1843), a Río de la Plata colonel
Pedro Eugenio Aramburu (1903–1970), Army General and president of Argentina from 1955 to 1958
Maite Aranburu, Basque politician

Other uses
The term may also refer to:
Aramburu Island, in California

Basque-language surnames